Wilfred Moke Abro (born 12 February 1988) is a DR Congolese former footballer who played as a centre back.

International career
Moke made his debut for the DR Congo national football team in a friendly 2-0 win over Botswana on 5 June 2017.

Career statistics

Statistics accurate as of match played 4 June 2021

Club

Honours
Konyaspor
Turkish Super Cup: 2017

References

External links

1988 births
Living people
Footballers from Kinshasa
Democratic Republic of the Congo footballers
Democratic Republic of the Congo international footballers
French footballers
French sportspeople of Democratic Republic of the Congo descent
Democratic Republic of the Congo expatriate footballers
Expatriate footballers in Romania
Democratic Republic of the Congo expatriate sportspeople in Romania
French expatriate sportspeople in Romania
Association football midfielders
Olympique Noisy-le-Sec players
Cádiz CF players
FC Rapid București players
FC Voluntari players
FC Steaua București players
Konyaspor footballers
Liga I players
Liga II players
Süper Lig players
2019 Africa Cup of Nations players
Black French sportspeople